Epipleoneura lamina is a species of damselfly in the threadtail family (Protoneuridae).

It can be in America: Guyana, Peru, and Venezuela.

References

External links 

 Query Results

Protoneuridae
Insects described in 1915